Homer Stryker Field is a stadium in Kalamazoo, Michigan. The baseball field is located in Kalamazoo's Mayors Riverfront Park.  It is primarily used for baseball, and is the home field for the Kalamazoo Growlers of the collegiate summer baseball Northwoods League.  It used to be the home field of the Kalamazoo Kings minor league baseball team in the Frontier League.  It opened in 1963, and holds 4,000 people.

Homer Stryker Field became the home of the Kalamazoo Kings in 2001. It had hosted the Kodiaks, another Frontier League team; each team has made some renovations to a facility that has been in use in some form since 1925, although the oldest part of the current structure, a concrete grandstand now with aluminum benches, appears to date to 1963.

The 1995 renovation added new aluminum seating and a press box above the old grandstand, along with some additional bleacher sections flanking the central stand. Some new outbuildings have been constructed in the last few years.
The field is somewhat unorthodox in that home plate is at the northeast corner of the grounds; traditionally and commonly, baseball fields have home plate at the westernmost end of the grounds so batters do not have to face the sun while hitting.

Homer Stryker was the patriarch of the Stryker Corporation. The Stryker family bought the naming rights in 2002 and placed Homer's name on the field.

Field dimensions
Left Field Foul Line: 290 feet

Center Field: 400 feet

Right Field Foul Line: 330 feet

References 

Baseball venues in Michigan
Minor league baseball venues
Buildings and structures in Kalamazoo, Michigan
Tourist attractions in Kalamazoo, Michigan
Sports in Kalamazoo, Michigan
Sports venues completed in 1963
1963 establishments in Michigan